The Fort Collins Police Services is the law enforcement agency of Fort Collins, Colorado. The department is headed by Chief Jeffrey Swoboda. It has 214 sworn individuals and 115 civilian personnel.

In addition to the Office of the Chief of Police (Administrative Division), the department is divided into Information Services, Investigative Services, Patrol Services and the Community and Special Services . Each service is headed by an officer in the rank of Assistant Chief. The department also has a Police Explorer group as well as an Auxiliary program, both of which are volunteer-roles. It periodically conducts a Citizen's Police Academy program.

The department has SWAT, motorcycle, and canine units. It also provides nine police officers who provide security to 34 schools in the area.

References

Fort Collins, Colorado
Municipal police departments of Colorado